Soul Central are a British music production duo originally founded by Andy Ward and Paul Timothy but now consisting of Matt Mckillop and Paul Timothy.

Biography
When Andy Ward was part of the original line up they had a number 6 hit in 2005 with "Strings of Life (Stronger on My Own)" on the UK Singles Chart, a cover of "Strings of Life" by Derrick May. It also reached number 1 on the UK Dance Chart. The track featured vocals from house singer Kathy Brown and was released through Defected Records. The Danny Krivitt re-edit also appeared on the Ministry of Sound compilation album, The Annual 2005.

The follow-up single "Need You Now" was an instrumental, and failed to match the success of the previous single, peaking at number 109 in the UK.

In May 2006, Soul Central released "In-Ten-City", a single promoted by Pete Tong on his BBC Radio 1 show. The track was released by the record company Soul Heaven/Defected and featured Billie on vocals. The song's title appeared to pay tribute to the Chicago, Illinois-based R&B and house-music act "Ten City" (derived from intensity), that enjoyed a number of club hits and urban radio hits in the late 1980s and early 1990s.

In August 2007, "Time After Time" (featuring Abigail Bailey) was released. It did not appear on the UK Singles Chart, but debuted at number 11 on the UK Indie Chart.

In 2008, Soul Central remixed "Glitter", a number-one hit song by the Japanese singer Ayumi Hamasaki. The remix appeared on her album Ayu-mi-x 6: Gold.

In 2019, Soul Central released "Un Amore Supremo", a balearic single that featured production and writing credits to Paul Timothy and Matt Mckillop, originally from the UK house act, Deep City Soul.

In 2020, Soul Central officially announced new member Matt Mckillop with the replacement and move to ensure the act continued to evolve. Subsequent tracks released digitally and on vinyl include "The Destroyer", as featured by Graeme Park on the live stream Hacienda House Party 2, with Kevin Saunderson, Arthur Baker, and Louie Vega. "Pimp Life EP"  was the duo's new vinyl release exclusive to Juno music. Digital originals followed with "Ice Queen" and "What Ya Gonna Do", complimenting their remix of Ken 45 - Your Body.

Discography

Singles

References

External links
Discogs.com

English house music duos
Record production duos
British record production teams